Homec is a settlement north of Domžale in the Upper Carniola region of Slovenia.

The parish church in the settlement is dedicated to the Nativity of Mary.

References

External links

Homec on Geopedia

Populated places in the Municipality of Domžale